Vachana sahitya is a form of rhythmic writing in Kannada (see also Kannada poetry) that evolved in the 11th century and flourished in the 12th century, as a part of the Sharana movement. Madara Chennaiah, an 11th-century cobbler-saint who lived during the reign of the Western Chalukyas is regarded by some scholars as the "father of Vachana poetry." The word "vachanas" literally means "(that which is) said". These are readily intelligible prose texts.

Jedara Dasimayya  who lived in the mid 10th century is considered the first proponent of lingayatism.
 
Later poets, such as Basavanna (1160), the founder of Lingayatism, prime minister of Southern Kalachuri King Bijjala II, considered Chennaiah to be his inspiration.

Vachanas and Sharana movement

Basavaadi Sharana's Vachanas are their experiences in the process of God realization. About 800 sharanas practiced the technique and wrote their experiences in terms of Guru (Unmanifest Chaitanya), Linga (Manifest Chaitanya), Jangama (Pure consciousness of Lingatattva in one's prana), Padodaka (intimacy with the knower/source of Lingatattva), and Prasada (becoming lingatattva).

As per record, this form exchange of experience of the realization of the God in group discussion has happened only in Karnataka by the sharanas mainly under the guidance of Basavanna, Channa Basavanna Allama Prabhu and Siddarameshwar. This fact has been attributed to the popularity of the movement. More than 200 Vachana writers (Vachanakaras) have been recorded and more than thirty of whom were women.

Vachanas

Vachanas are brief paragraphs, and they end with one or the other local names under which Shiva is invoked or offered Pooja. In style, they are epigrammatical, parallelistic and allusive. They dwell on the vanity of riches, the valuelessness of mere rites or book learning, the uncertainty of life and the spiritual privileges of Shiva Bhakta (worshiper of lord Shiva). The Vachanas call men to give up the desire for worldly wealth and ease, to live lives of sobriety and detachment from the world and to turn to Siva for refuge.

Authors of a particular Vachana can be identified by the style of invocation of God (Basveshvara invokes "Kudala Sangama Deva", while Allama Prabhu invokes "Guheshwara", Akkamadevi invokes "Channa Mallikarjuna", Siddhrama (Siddheshwar) of Solapur invokes "Kapilasidda Mallikarjuna") in the vachana. The existing readings of the vachanas are mostly set by the European understanding of the Indian traditions.

About 22,000 vachanas have been published. The government of Karnataka has published Samagra Vachana Samputa in 15 volumes. Karnataka University Dharwad has published collections of individual vachana poets.

Jedara Dasimaiah is called the 'Adya Vachanakara' (The First Vachanakara).

In spite of the large collection of Vachanas, there was no single place where all Vachanas could be obtained. The credit for restoring the Vachana literature goes to Vachana Pitamaha D. P.G Halakatti. He moved from door to door and collected and restored many Vachana literatures.

See also
 Kalachuris of Kalyani Kingdom
 Kannada literature
 Palkuriki Somanatha

Notes

References

Further reading
 Lingayata Dharmada Modalaneya Pustaka Kannada, 1982, PM Giriraju.
 Jatigala Huttu Kannada, 1982, PM Giriraju.
Speaking of Siva, by A. K. Ramanujan. Penguin. 1973. .
 Sadbhakta Charitra Kannada. PM Giriraju. https://openlibrary.org/works/OL11062327W/Girirājanu_sērisida_sadbhakta_cāritrya

Sources 

Vachana Sahityha
Vachanas by Sri Basavanna, Dasimayya, Akka Mahadheviyavaru and Allamaprabhu dhevaru (trans. AK Ramanujan)
Vachana Sahitya Web Site Published by Government of Karnataka
Vachana Sanchaya, Vachana Sahitya Digitization & Research Project

Indian poetics
Kannada literature
Lingayatism